The 2008 Missouri Tigers football team represented the University of Missouri in the 2008 NCAA Division I FBS football season. The team was coached by Gary Pinkel, who returned in his eighth season with Mizzou, and played their home games at Faurot Field at Memorial Stadium.

Quarterback Chase Daniel returned for his final year of eligibility and led the Tigers to a second appearance in the Big 12 Championship Game.

Recruits
Key Losses:
 SS Cornelius "Pig" Brown
 WR William Franklin
 OT Tyler Luellen
 TE Martin Rucker
 C Adam Spieker
 RB Tony Temple

Five junior Tigers will return for the 2008 season after turning down the NFL Draft, including QB Chase Daniel, TE Chase Coffman, SS William Moore, Delaware Stryker Sulak and DT Ziggy Hood. The Tigers will have 16 returning starters, 10 on defense and six on offense.

Redshirt freshman DE John Stull was removed from the team on January 11, 2008, after being arrested on drug charges.

22 Recruits list.

Following their Cotton Bowl Classic victory, Mizzou landed a number of previously committed recruits from the state of Missouri. QB Blaine Gabbert from Ballwin, Missouri is the No. 1 rated prep player in the state of Missouri, and No. 1 rated pro-style quarterback in his recruiting class. and the Tigers landed him after he had previously committed to Nebraska. According to Rivals rankings, the Tigers also landed WR Wes Kemp (#5), TE Andrew Jones (#3), DE Alden Smith (#6) and RB Drew Temple (#11), brother of former Tigers player Tony Temple all from in-state high schools.

From out of state, the Tigers landed OT Dan Hoch, who like Gabbert previously committed to Nebraska.

Schedule
Missouri Tigers schedule

Game summaries

Illinois

In a close contest where Missouri held a big lead for most of the game, Illinois cuts it to within 10 near the end but gets no closer.

Southeast Missouri State

Missouri takes a commanding 42-0 lead over their FCS competition in their best defensive performance of the year, the first half really showcased their offensive abilities. The second half was a mere formality as Missouri's backups played the entire second half.

Nevada

Derrick Washington, Jeremy Maclin, and Jeff Wolfert scored for Missouri, and Colin Kaepernick rushed for a 1-yard touchdown for Nevada in the first quarter.

Chase Daniel passed to Jared Perry for 27 yards for a 2nd-quarter touchdown. Brett Jaekle kicked a field goal for Nevada, followed by Washington's 2-yard touchdown for Missouri. Maclin caught a pass (14 yards) from Daniel for Missouri, followed by a Kaepernick pass (42 yards) to Marko Mitchell for a Nevada touchdown.

Third quarter was all Missouri. Daniel passed to Maclin for a 49-yard touchdown, Tommy Saunders passed to Chase Coffman for a 32-yard touchdown and then Chase Paton rushed for a 3-yard touchdown. Jeff Wolfert kicked a 24-yard field goal for Missouri.

Buffalo

Missouri looked a bit flat at times against Buffalo but still won in commanding fashion.

at Nebraska

Chase Daniel threw three touchdown passes, Derrick Washington ran for 139 yards and scored three times, as Missouri mopped up Nebraska for their first road win against the Cornhuskers in 30 years (1978). The Tigers never had to punt all game.

The 35-point defeat was the Huskers' most lopsided home loss in 53 years.

Oklahoma State

Oklahoma State handed Missouri their first loss as well as forced their first three and outs all year, giving teams a blueprint on how to slow down the Tigers' "video game offense" which looked unstoppable up to that point.

at Texas

Sportscasters touted the 2005 contest with the Missouri Tigers as a showcase between two of the best dual-threat quarterbacks playing in college football, pitting Missouri quarterback Brad Smith against Vince Young of Texas. The two players combined for 582 yards total offense. Both Young and Smith led their respective team in rushing yards. Young had 108 rushing yards while Smith had 57. Young had 236 passing yards compared to Smith's 181.  Texas won the game 51–20 to extend its series lead over Missouri to 15–5.  The two teams did not face each other in 2006 or 2007.

Like the 2005 game, the 2008 matchup was billed as a battle between two great quarterbacks, Colt McCoy of Texas and Chase Daniel of Missouri having both been mentioned as possible Heisman trophy candidates.  Texas was playing their first home game as a number-one ranked team since 1977.  Missouri won their first five games of 2008 and had moved into third place in the nation before they were upset at home by the Oklahoma State Cowboys and fell to eleventh place.  The Tigers came into the game with a 0-10 record against number-one ranked teams, and they had not won a football game in Austin since 1896.

To help ensure that the Longhorns did not dwell on the emotional victory over the Sooners one week earlier, the UT coaching staff called the team together and buried the TX/OU game ball in the UT practice field on the Monday before the game. The morning of the game the betting line on the morning of the game was Texas by 4½ points; the over/under was 65. ESPN College GameDay was in Austin for the game, which set a new attendance record (UT, state of Texas, Big12 Conference) of 98,383.

Missouri won the coin toss and elected to receive the kickoff.  They returned the ball to their 40 yard-line.  On the first play from scrimmage, Missouri tried a reverse, but Texas dropped them for a loss and Missouri went three-and-out.  Missouri had gone without a three-and-out for the whole season until having two during their loss the previous week against Oklahoma State.  The Missouri punt rolled to the Texas 5-yard line.  Colt McCoy led the Longhorns 95-yards for a touchdown.

Texas had the ball 5-times in the first half and scored a touchdown each time, taking a 35-0 lead.  Missouri scored a field goal at the end of the first half to make the score 35-3.  Texas was forced to punt on their first possession of the second half and Missouri scored a touchdown to narrow the lead to 35-10.  Texas rebounded with a touchdown and Missouri was never able to cut the lead to less than 25 points.  The final score was Texas-56, Missouri-31.

McCoy completed the game with 337 yards on 29-of-32 passing with two touchdowns, rushed for two more and at one point completed a school-record 17 passes in a row.  His completion ratio of 79% coming into the game improved as he completed 91% of his passes in this game. His four touchdowns put him in first place for the most career touchdowns scored at Texas (82), passing Vince Young (81).

ESPN's recap of the game said, "And when McCoy dribbled the ball on the ground only to pick it up and throw a strike that kept the last drive of the half alive, he created the 'Did you just see that?' moment of the season so far.  With one half of near-perfect football, Texas buried not only the remnants of the Sooners and the Tigers, but any doubt about who deserves to be No. 1.  For now."

Colorado

Source: ESPN
    
    
    
    
    
    
    
    
    
    

The Tigers won their 600th game since their inception in 1890, in an overwhelming 58-0 shutout of the Buffaloes in the Tigers' Homecoming game at Faurot Field rolling up 491 total offensive yards. Chase Daniel passed for 302 yards, and the runners ran for another 189 yards.  Daniel was 31-for-37 throwing five touchdowns, intercepted once. Jeremy Maclin had 11 pass receptions for 134 yards with two touchdowns. The defense was outstanding, holding Colorado to a mere 41 net yards rushing and 158 passing for only 199 total offensive yards.

at Baylor

Missouri looked good early but barely scraped by Baylor for another flat performance in what was quickly becoming a disappointing season for the Tigers.

Kansas State

Getting back on track, Missouri routed Kansas State coasting on a commanding 24-3 halftime lead.

at Iowa State

Iowa State put up very little resistance against the much better Missouri Tigers who played their backups for most of the second half.

Kansas (Border Showdown in Kansas City, Missouri)

On November 30, offensive coordinator Dave Christensen accepted the job as head coach for the Wyoming Cowboys in 2009.

Kansas also got their revenge for having their perfect season ruined the previous year by handing the Tigers their third loss and all but guaranteeing they wouldn't play in a BCS bowl game unless they got a win over Oklahoma.

Oklahoma (Dr. Pepper Big 12 Championship in Kansas City, Missouri)

QB Chase Daniel became the Missouri career total offense yardage leader with 13,256. He entered the game with 12,988 yards and had 268 total yards (255 passing, 13 rushing) in the game. He moved ahead of Brad Smith (13,088) and had 13,256 at halftime. Senior CB Tru Vaughns made his first career start. PK Jeff Wolfert improved his career PAT mark to a perfect 182 of 182. TE Chase Coffman recorded his 30th career touchdown reception. He was already Missouri's all-time touchdown reception leader. Former walk-on WR Tommy Saunders moved into sixth place on the MU career receptions list. He finished the game with 144 to pass current Kansas City Chiefs' Will Franklin.

Jeremy Maclin leads all of major-college football in all-purpose yards per game with 203.54 (2,646 yds. in 13 G), over 20 yards more than second-place Jahvid Best (California). 
He has 1,221 receiving, 987 kickoff return, 250 rushing, and 188 punt returns yardage.

On December 11, TE Chase Coffman won the prestigious John Mackey Tight End Award as the nation's top tight end.

Through 13 games in 2008, MU's offense ranks 4th in the nation in passing (340.38 ypg), 6th in total offense (497.46 ypg), 6th in scoring (43.15 ppg) and 8th in pass efficiency (162.69 rating).

On December 12, Pinkel said the new offensive coordinator will be present quarterbacks' coach and recruiting coordinator, David Yost.

Northwestern (16th Valero Alamo Bowl in San Antonio, Texas)

Roster

Coaching staff

Coaching staff from:

Rankings
(as of January 9, 2009)

Statistics

Statistics from:

Team
(to December 29, 2008)

Scores by quarter
(through December 29, 2008)

Offense

Rushing
(to December 29, 2008)

Passing
(to December 29, 2008)

Receiving
(to December 29, 2008)

Field Goals / PAT
(to December 29, 2008)

Special teams
(to December 29, 2008)

Interceptions
(to December 29, 2008)

Fumble Returns
(to December 29, 2008)

Defense
(to December 29, 2008)

References

External links
 

Missouri
Alamo Bowl champion seasons
Missouri Tigers football seasons
Missouri Tigers football